Juan José Velásquez Ojeda (born March 20, 1971 in Lima ) was a Peruvian footballer.

Club career
Velásquez played for a number of clubs in Peru, including Alianza Atlético and Sport Boys in the Peruvian First Division.

International career
From 1999 to 2000, he also made six appearances for the senior Peru national football team.

References

External links

1971 births
Living people
Footballers from Lima
Association football midfielders
Peruvian footballers
Peru international footballers
1999 Copa América players
Peruvian Primera División players
Deportivo Italia players
Deportivo Pesquero footballers
Alianza Atlético footballers
Sport Boys footballers
Unión Huaral footballers
Cienciano footballers
Coronel Bolognesi footballers
Peruvian expatriate footballers
Expatriate footballers in Venezuela